4th Infantry Regiment, later the 4th Infantry Regiment of the Lithuanian King Mindaugas was a Lithuanian Army infantry regiment that existed from 1918 to 1940 and was located in Panevėžys.

Formation 
The regiment was founded on 29 December 1918, when the Defence Ministry of the Lithuanian Republic allowed the officer Jonas Variakojis to assemble and command the Panevėžys Region Defence Unit. On 5 January 1919, Variakojis managed to salvage 70 rifles out of the retreating German Army and by January 7, his unit received its first order. From March 22, the unit is known as the Separate Panevėžys Battalion and from 1919 June 20, as the Panevėžys Battalion.

Lithuanian Wars of Independence 

The military formation was fighting the invading Bolsheviks from its foundation, specifically near Panevėžys, Kėdainiai and Ukmergė. On 1919 May 18-23, the regiment took part in the Kurkliai-Panevėžys operation, although it did not succeed in defending Panevėžys. Much more successful was the 1919 May 26 to June 3 Kupiškis-Utena operation, during which Kupiškis, Rokiškis and Alūkšta were liberated. The regiment pushed the Bolsheviks beyond the Daugava river.

From 15 October 1919, the regiment fought the Bermontians. 

For its victorious battles, the Šiauliai town gave the unit a flag on 1 November 1919, the same day the unit was called the 4th Infantry Regiment of the Lithuanian King Mindaugas.

On 26 July 1920, the regiment entered Vilnius and defended it against Polish attacks in the start of October, later engaging them in the Musninkai-Širvintos sector, later partaking in the Battle of Giedraičiai. During the Lithuanian Wars of Independence, 3 officers and 72 soldiers of the regiment were killed in action, while 121 soldiers were wounded in combat. Order of the Cross of Vytis was accorded to 33 officers and 198 soldiers of the regiment.

Interwar 
In 1922, the regiment was moved to Panevėžys. In 1926, it was given the flag of the 3rd Class Order of the Cross of Vytis with the inscription: "God, help us defend the Fatherland's liberty and honour". The regiment was part of the 1st Lithuanian Infantry Division, whose subunits were sometimes located in Kupiškis ir Ukmergė.

Soviet Occupation 
With the Soviet Occupation of Lithuania, the regiment was renamed as the "4th Infantry Regiment" on 25 July 1940 and disbanded on 30 August 1940. On the disbanded regiment's basis, the Red Army's 215th Rifle Regiment was formed on 9 September 1940.

Regiment's commanders 

 1919 officer Jonas Variakojis
 1919 Colonel Maksimas Katchė
 1921 Colonel Pranas Tamašauskas
 1927 General Headquarters Colonel Viktoras Giedrys
 Colonel Kazys Tallat-Kelpša
 1931 General Headquarters Colonel Vaclovas Griganavičius
 1935 Colonel Kazys Sprangauskas
 1936 Colonel Vaclovas Žadeika
 1940 Colonel Petras Genys
 1940 Colonel Antanas Šurkus

References

Sources 

 
 

History of Panevėžys
Infantry regiments of Lithuania
Military units and formations established in 1918
Military units and formations disestablished in 1940